Lip Sync Battle Philippines is a Philippine television reality competition show broadcast by GMA Network. The show is the Philippine version of the American reality television series of the same title. Hosted by Michael V. and Iya Villania, it premiered on February 27, 2016 on the network's Sabado Star Power sa Gabi line up replacing Celebrity Bluff. The show concluded on July 1, 2018 with a total of 3 seasons and 40 episodes. It was replaced by The Clash in its timeslot.

Overview 

Lip Sync Battle Philippines debuted on GMA Network on February 27, 2016. It is presented by Michael V. with Iya Villania serving as the color commentator.

The show is an adaptation of the American TV series, Lip Sync Battle. The game pits two celebrities against each other in a lip sync battle for two rounds. The celebrities lip sync songs of their choice. The crowd determines the winner after the two rounds have been completed.

During the third episode of the first season, the show had their first tag team battle with Betong Sumaya and John Feir battling Gladys Guevarra and Pekto.

Episodes

Ratings
According to AGB Nielsen Philippines' Mega Manila household television ratings, the pilot episode of Lip Sync Battle Philippines earned a 25.6% rating. While the premiere of the second season scored a 24.3% rating.

Accolades

References

External links
 
 

2016 Philippine television series debuts
2018 Philippine television series endings
Filipino-language television shows
GMA Network original programming
Philippine reality television series
Philippine television series based on American television series